Dean Maguirc College is an all-ability 11-18 co-educational school in Carrickmore, Northern Ireland.

History
The college is named after the 17th century priest named Brian MacGurk who was born in the neighbourhood.  He was appointed Dean of the Diocese by St Oliver Plunkett.  Following his imprisonment he died in Armagh Jail on 13 Feb 1713. He is commemorated both in the name of the college and by the Celtic Cross outside St Colmcille's Church.

The number of pupils in the college has steadily increased and by 2022 it had reached over 600. In view of the substantial increase in enrollment the college was awarded over £13million in 2022 for new facilities.

College motto
The college motto Proficiens Sapientia et Gratia can be translated as Proficient in wisdom and grace which is the aim of the college.

Academics
The school provides instruction in a range of academic subjects. In 2018, 59.6% of its entrants achieved five or more GCSEs at grades A* to C, including the core subjects English and Maths. Also in 2018, 84.1% of its entrants to the A-level exam achieved A*-C grades.

House system
At the start of Year 8 all pupils are divided into one of four Houses (Canice, Davog, Finbarr and Tiernach). These houses are named after ancient Irish saints. The pupils remain attached to one house throughout their time at the college.

Extra-curricular activities
The college has a choir and organises several musicals each year, and participates in a variety of sports including Gaelic football, hurling, handball, basketball and athletics.

References

Omagh
Catholic secondary schools in Northern Ireland
Secondary schools in County Tyrone